Scaeosopha nullivalvella is a species of moth of the family Cosmopterigidae. It is found in China, Brunei and Indonesia.

The wingspan is 14.5–17 mm. The ground colour of the forewings is greyish-brown, diffused with dark-brown scales. The hindwings are deep-brown.

Etymology
The species name refers to the absence of valvella and is derived from Latin nulli- (meaning null) and the word valvella.

References

Moths described in 2012
Scaeosophinae